Mouad Bouchareb is an Algerian politician. He served as president of the lower house of Algeria's parliament, the People's National Assembly, from 24 October 2018 to 2 July 2019. He resigned after protesters demanded his removal.

Slimane Chenine was appointed as his successor.

References 

Living people
Year of birth missing (living people)
Place of birth missing (living people)
21st-century Algerian politicians
Presidents of the People's National Assembly of Algeria